also known as Mitsubishi Juko Sagamihara Rugby Club, are a Japanese rugby union team based in Sagamihara, Kanagawa Prefecture, Japan. The owner of this club is Mitsubishi Heavy Industries.

The club was founded in 1981. It came second in the Top East 10 league in 2004-5 and entered the Top League challenge series play-off.

The club won the Top East 11 league in 2006–07 and entered the Top League in 2007–08. The team was named Dynaboars (a conflation of "dynamic" and "boars") as part of their promotion to the Top League; however, they were demoted at the end of the season.
The Dynaboars  signed ex-Wales international and IRB World Player of the Year 2008 Shane Williams in 2012, retiring in 2014.

Players

Current squad
The Mitsubishi Sagamihara DynaBoars squad for the 2023 season is:

Former players
  Simon Kasprowicz - lock
  Blair Urlich - No. 8
  Kohei Matsui - center three-quarter back
  Troy Flavell - lock
  Isma-eel Dollie - Flyhalf
  Shane Williams – Wing
  Dave Walder - Flyhalf
  David Milo - No. 8
  Hamish Gard inside centre

Coach
 Scott Pierce
 John Mulvihill
 George Konia

References

External links
Mitsubishi Dynaboars - official page (Japanese)

Mitsubishi Heavy Industries
Sports teams in Kanagawa Prefecture
Rugby in Kantō
Rugby clubs established in 1981
1981 establishments in Japan
Japan Rugby League One teams